Jan Thomas Johannes Adrianus van Laarhoven (born 18 December 1945) is a retired Dutch rower. He competed at the 1968 Summer Olympics in the eight event and finished in eighth place.

References

1945 births
Living people
Dutch male rowers
Olympic rowers of the Netherlands
Rowers at the 1968 Summer Olympics
People from Moerdijk
Sportspeople from North Brabant